Emil Gustav Vilhelm Jørgensen (3 September 1858 - 27 May 1942) was a Danish architect, most notable for his work in the National Romantic style such as the Church of the Deaf (De Døves Kirke) in Copenhagen.

Biography

He was born at Rendsburg in  Schleswig-Holstein. He was the son of Andreas Carl Gustav Jørgensen (1831-80) and his wife Vilhelmine Wille (1836-1909). He graduated from the Technical University of Denmark and was admitted to the Academy of Fine Arts' Architecture School (Kunstakademiets Arkitektskole) in 1876. He graduated as  an architect in 1883. In 1892, he conducted travel studies to Germany and Northern Italy. For over a decade he worked with architect Hans Jørgen Holm. He was later associated on the Copenhagen Town Hall and at Bispebjerg Hospital projects as a close  assistant of architect Martin Nyrop.

Jørgensen exhibited at Charlottenborg Spring Exhibition 1886, 1888, 1891, 1899, 1900 and 1903–04.

Personal life
Jørgensen married Anna Margrethe Christine Knudsen (1863-1923) in 1888.

He died on 27 May 1942 in Gentofte and was buried in Vestre Cemetery  (Vestre Kirkegård) in Copenhagen.

References

Other sources
Vestre Kirkegård

1858 births
1942 deaths
People from Rendsburg-Eckernförde
Technical University of Denmark alumni
Danish architects
 Knights of the  Order of the Dannebrog